Philip Willis Tone (April 9, 1923 – November 28, 2001) was a United States circuit judge of the United States Court of Appeals for the Seventh Circuit and previously a judge of the United States District Court for the Northern District of Illinois.

Education and career

Born in Chicago, Illinois, Tone received an Artium Baccalaureus degree from State University of Iowa (now the University of Iowa) in 1943 and was a First Lieutenant in the United States Army during World War II, from 1943 to 1946. He received a Juris Doctor from State University of Iowa College of Law in 1948. He was a law clerk to Supreme Court Justice Wiley B. Rutledge from 1948 to 1949. He was then in private practice in Washington, D.C. until 1950, and in Chicago until 1972.

Federal judicial service

On November 29, 1971, Tone was nominated by President Richard Nixon to a new seat on the United States District Court for the Northern District of Illinois created by 84 Stat. 294. He was confirmed by the United States Senate on December 2, 1971, and received his commission on January 26, 1972. His service terminated on May 17, 1974, due to elevation to the Seventh Circuit.

On April 22, 1974, Nixon nominated Tone to a seat on the United States Court of Appeals for the Seventh Circuit vacated by Judge Roger Kiley. Tone was confirmed by the Senate on May 6, 1974, and received his commission on May 14, 1974. Tone served in that capacity until his resignation from the bench, on April 30, 1980.

Post judicial service

Tone then returned to private practice in Chicago until his death, on November 28, 2001, in Glenview, Illinois.

See also 
List of law clerks of the Supreme Court of the United States (Seat 3)

References

Sources
 

1923 births
2001 deaths
Judges of the United States District Court for the Northern District of Illinois
United States district court judges appointed by Richard Nixon
Judges of the United States Court of Appeals for the Seventh Circuit
United States court of appeals judges appointed by Richard Nixon
20th-century American judges
University of Iowa alumni
University of Iowa College of Law alumni
Law clerks of the Supreme Court of the United States
United States Army officers